HTC Shift (code name: Clio) is an Ultra-Mobile PC by HTC.

Features
Dual Operating System
Microsoft Windows Vista Business 32-Bit (notebook mode)
SnapVUE (PDA mode)
Processor
Intel A110 Stealey CPU 800 MHz (for Windows Vista)
ARM11 CPU (for SnapVUE)
Memory and Storage
1 GB RAM (notebook mode)
64 MB RAM (PDA mode)
40/60 GB HDD
SD card slot
Intel GMA 950 graphics
Communications
Quad band GSM / GPRS / EDGE (data only): GSM 850, GSM 900, GSM 1800, GSM 1900
Triband UMTS / HSDPA (data only): UMTS 850, UMTS 1900, UMTS 2100
Wi-Fi 802.11 b/g
Bluetooth v2.0
USB port
7" display
Active TFT touchscreen, 16M colors
800 x 480 pixels (Wide-VGA), 7 inches
QWERTY keyboard
Handwriting recognition
Fingerprint Recognition
Ringtones
MP3
Dual speakers

Upgrading
In November 2011 the team from DistantEarth have succeeded in loading the developer preview of Windows 8 onto the HTC Shift.

References

HTC Shift forums on XDA-Developers
HTC Shift on pof blog: technical information about HTC Shift
HTC Source: a news blog dedicated to HTC devices
HTC Shift X9500 on Pocketables: Many photos, features, and reviews
TechCast Reviews the HTC Shift

Mobile computers
Shift